The Bandung Geological Museum opened in Bandung, Indonesia in 1928. On December 10, 1871, six meteorites fell in Sindanglaut, West Java, Indonesia. This rare fall of a LL6 chondrite included an 11.5 kg TKW that is held by the Bandung Geological Museum and the Paris Museum of History. The museum has 13 meteorites that fell at various times on in areas of Java.

See also
List of museums and cultural institutions in Indonesia
List of colonial buildings in Bandung

Gallery

References

Natural history museums in Indonesia
Geology museums
Buildings and structures in Bandung
Education in Bandung
Museums in West Java